The Twenty-sixth Dynasty of Egypt (notated Dynasty XXVI, alternatively 26th Dynasty or Dynasty 26) dynasty was the last native dynasty to rule Egypt before the Persian conquest in 525 BC (although others followed). The dynasty's reign (664–525 BC) is also called the Saite Period after the city of Sais, where its pharaohs had their capital, and marks the beginning of the Late Period of ancient Egypt.

History
This dynasty traced its origins to the Twenty-fourth Dynasty. Psamtik I was probably a descendant of Bakenranef.

Following the Assyrian conquest of Egypt by the Neo-Assyrian Empire during the reigns of Taharqa and Tantamani, and the subsequent collapse of the Twenty-fifth Dynasty of Egypt, Psamtik I was recognized as sole king over all of Egypt. Psamtik formed alliances with King Gyges of Lydia, who sent him mercenaries from Caria and ancient Greece which Psamtik used to unify all of Egypt under his rule.

With the sack of Nineveh in 612 BC and the fall of the Neo-Assyrian Empire, both Psamtik and his successors attempted to reassert Egyptian power in the Near East, but were driven back by the Neo-Babylonian Empire under Nebuchadnezzar II. With the help of Greek mercenaries, Pharaoh Apries was able to hold back Babylonian attempts to conquer Egypt. 

The Persians would eventually invade Egypt in 525 BCE, when their king, Cambyses II, captured and later executed Psamtik III, in the Achaemenid conquest of Egypt, eventually founding the Achaemenid Twenty-seventh Dynasty of Egypt.

Archaeology 
In May 2020, an Egyptian-Spanish archaeological mission headed by Esther Ponce revealed a unique cemetery, which consists of one room built with glazed limestone dating back to the 26th Dynasty (also known as the El-Sawi era) at the site of ancient Oxyrhynchus. Archaeologists also uncovered bronze coins, clay seals, Roman tombstones and small crosses. On October 3, 2020, Egypt unveiled 59 coffins of priests and clerks from the 26th dynasty, dating to nearly 2,500 years ago.

Art

Pharaohs of the 26th Dynasty

The 26th Dynasty may be related to the 24th Dynasty. Manetho begins the dynasty with:
 Ammeris the Nubian, 12 (or 18) years
 Stephinates, 7 years
 Nechepsos, 6 years
 Necho, 8 years.

When the Nubian King Shabaka defeated Bakenranef, son of Tefnakht, he likely installed a Nubian commander as governor at Sais. This may be the man named Ammeris. Stephinates may be a descendant of Bakenrenef. He is sometimes referred to as Tefnakht II in the literature. Nechepsos has been identified with a local king named Nekauba (678–672 BC). Manetho's Necho is King Necho I (672–664 BC); Manetho gives his reign as 8 years. Necho was killed during a conflict with the Nubian king Tantamani. Psamtik I fled to Nineveh – capital of the Neo-Assyrian Empire – and returned to Egypt when Ashurbanipal defeated Tantamani and drove him back south. Scholars now start the 26th Dynasty with the reign of Psamtik I.

Sextus Julius Africanus states in his often accurate version of Manetho's Epitome that the dynasty numbered 9 pharaohs, beginning with a "Stephinates" (Tefnakht II) and ending with Psamtik III. Africanus also notes that Psamtik I and Necho I ruled for 54 and 8 years respectively.

Timeline of the 26th Dynasty

See also

History of ancient Egypt
Twenty-sixth Dynasty of Egypt family tree
Late Period of ancient Egypt
Saite Oracle Papyrus

References

Bibliography
 Aidan Dodson, Dyan Hilton. The Complete Royal Families of Ancient Egypt. The American University in Cairo Press, London, 2004.
 Kenneth Kitchen, The Third Intermediate Period in Egypt, 1100–650 B.C. (Book & Supplement) Aris & Phillips. 1986 .
 Karl Jansen-Winkeln, Bild und Charakter der ägyptischen 26. Dynastie, Altorientalische Forschungen, 28 (2001), 165–182.

 
States and territories established in the 7th century BC
States and territories disestablished in the 6th century BC
26
Nile Delta
7th century BC in Egypt
6th century BC in Egypt
664 BC
7th-century BC establishments in Egypt
6th-century BC disestablishments
525 BC
1st-millennium BC disestablishments in Egypt